Atreyapuram mandal is one of the 22 mandals in Konaseema district of Andhra Pradesh. As per census 2011, there are 15 villages in this Mandal.

Demographics 
Atreyapuram Mandal has total population of 65,580 as per the Census 2011 out of which 33,096 are males while 32,484 are females. The average Sex Ratio of Atreyapuram Mandal is 982. The total literacy rate of Atreyapuram Mandal is 69%.

Towns and villages

Villages 
1. Ankampalem
2. Atreyapuram
3. Kattunga
4. Lolla
5. Merlapalem
6. Narkedimilli
7. Peravaram
8. Pulidindi
9. Rajavaram
10. Ryali
11. Utchili
12. Vadapalle
13. Vaddiparru
14. Velicheru
15. Vasanthawada

See also 
List of mandals in Andhra Pradesh

References 

Mandals in Konaseema district
Mandals in Andhra Pradesh